Mischocarpus is a genus of about nineteen species of trees known to science, constituting part of the plant family Sapindaceae.
They grow naturally from Australia and New Guinea, though Malesia as far north as the Philippines, through SE. Asia, Indo-China and S. China, to India at their farthest west. 
The eleven Australian species known to science grow naturally in the rainforests of the eastern coastal zone of New South Wales and Queensland, from Newcastle northwards through to north-eastern Queensland and Cape York Peninsula.

Naming and classification
In 1825 Carl L. Blume first formally published this genus name and its type species M. sundaicus.

In 1879 Ludwig A. T. Radlkofer first formally published new names of many species.

In 1977 R. W. J. M. van der Ham published a revision of the genus, including new names of  species.

Species
This listing was sourced from the Australian Plant Name Index and Australian Plant Census, Flora Malesiana, botanical science journal papers, and the Flora of China.:
 Mischocarpus ailae  (was subsumed within M. lachnocarpus), woolly bush apple – Endemic to rainforests of NE. NSW & SE. Qld, Australia
 Mischocarpus albescens  – Daintree region endemic, NE. Qld, Australia
 Mischocarpus anodontus  – NE. NSW to CE. to NE. Qld, Australia
 Mischocarpus australis  – CE. NSW through to SE. Qld, Australia
 Mischocarpus exangulatus  –  Cape York Peninsula and NE. Qld endemic, Australia
 Mischocarpus grandissimus  – NE. Qld endemic, Australia
 Mischocarpus hainanensis  – Hainan, China
 Mischocarpus lachnocarpus  (previously M. ailae was subsumed within here) – NE. Qld to Cape York Peninsula, Australia and New Guinea
 Mischocarpus largifolius  – Solomon Islands to New Guinea
 Mischocarpus macrocarpus  – NE. to CE. Qld, Australia
 Mischocarpus montanus  (Australian plants previously included in M. pyriformis subsp. retusus as a misapplied name) – endemic to mountains of NE. Qld, Australia
 Mischocarpus paradoxus  – New Guinea
 Mischocarpus pentapetalus  – India, S. China through SE. Asia to W. Malesia as far as a line from Philippines–Borneo–Java
 Mischocarpus pyriformis  – C. coast NSW through E Qld to NE. Qld, Australia and New Guinea
 subsp. papuanus – New Guinea
 subsp. pyriformis – C. coast NSW northwards to NE Qld, Australia
 subsp. retusus (previously misapplied to Australian M. montanus plants) – New Guinea
 Mischocarpus reticulatus  – New Guinea
 Mischocarpus stipitatus  – Cape York Peninsula to NE. to C. coast Qld, Australia
 Mischocarpus sundaicus  – India, S. China, SE. Asia and through Malesia
 Mischocarpus triqueter  – Philippines

Species accepted by the authoritative Flora Malesiana while awaiting formal publication, as provisionally published names and descriptions
 Mischocarpus prob. spec. nov.: R.W.Ham (UPNG (Millar) 1042 (K)) – New Guinea

References

Cited works

External links
 Mischocarpus photographs in Flickr
 
 

Sapindaceae genera
Sapindales of Australia
Flora of tropical Asia
Flora of New South Wales
Flora of Queensland
Flora of China
Sapindaceae